John McKim (22 January 1926 – 20 June 2000) was a Scottish footballer who played in The Football League as a forward.

Career
Born in Greenock, Scotland, McKim played in the Football League for Colchester United, making 129 league appearances scoring 44 goals. He had earlier been with Chelsea, however, he made no league appearances for the club.

References

External links
 

1926 births
2000 deaths
Scottish footballers
Chelsea F.C. players
Colchester United F.C. players
English Football League players
Association football forwards